Michael Karl "Dozer" Shower (born February 14, 1968) is an American politician and a Republican member of the Alaska State Senate since February 22, 2018, representing District E. Shower was appointed by Governor Bill Walker to fill a vacancy created by Mike Dunleavy, who resigned in order to focus on his run for governor. Shower became a resident of Alaska in 1993. He is an Air Force veteran and a pilot for FedEx.

Shower has an MBA from Touro University. He reached the rank of lieutenant colonel as a pilot in the U.S. Air Force, piloting F-15C Eagles and F-22 Raptors.

References

External links
Biography at Ballotpedia

1968 births
Republican Party Alaska state senators
Living people
People from Wasilla, Alaska
United States Air Force Academy alumni
21st-century American politicians